Grafström is a Swedish surname that may refer to
Anders Abraham Grafström (1790–1870), Swedish historian, priest and poet
Bengt Grafström (born 1946), Swedish radio and television presenter 
Gillis Grafström (1893–1938), Swedish figure skater
Thyra Grafström (1864-1925), Swedish textile artist

Swedish-language surnames